Marco Imperiale (born 1 May 1999) is an Italian footballer who plays as a defender for  club Carrarese.

Club career
He made his Serie C debut for Catanzaro on 20 November 2016 in a game against Foggia.

On 9 August 2019, he joined Piacenza on loan.

On 29 August 2020, he moved to Carrarese on loan with an option to buy.

On 16 July 2021, he returned to Carrarese on a permanent basis and signed a three-year contract.

References

External links
 
 

1999 births
Living people
People from Partinico
Footballers from Sicily
Italian footballers
Association football defenders
Serie B players
Serie C players
U.S. Catanzaro 1929 players
Empoli F.C. players
A.C.N. Siena 1904 players
Piacenza Calcio 1919 players
Carrarese Calcio players
Sportspeople from the Province of Palermo